Joseph John Sotak (February 9, 1914 – December 11, 2007) was an American professional basketball player. He played in the National Basketball League for Whiting/Hammond Ciesar All-Americans and averaged 4.1 points per game.

References 

1914 births
2007 deaths
American men's basketball players
United States Coast Guard personnel of World War II
Basketball players from Indiana
Centers (basketball)
Forwards (basketball)
Hammond Ciesar All-Americans players
Whiting Ciesar All-Americans players